The Carman Subdivision is a railroad line owned by CSX Transportation in the U.S. state of New York. The line is located in and near Schenectady along a former New York Central Railroad line. It connects the Hudson Subdivision in Schenectady with the Selkirk Subdivision at Rotterdam.

History
The Carman Subdivision opened in 1902 as part of a bypass around Schenectady for the New York Central Railroad. It became part of Conrail through mergers and takeovers, and was assigned to CSX in the 1999 breakup of Conrail.

See also
 List of CSX Transportation lines

References

CSX Transportation lines
Rail infrastructure in New York (state)
New York Central Railroad lines